Mac Lochlainn and MacLochlainn are Irish surnames. They are patronymic forms of the Gaelic Lochlann, meaning 'Son of a Norseman'.

People

Mac Lochlainn
Muirchertach Mac Lochlainn, 12th-century Irish king
Niall Mac Lochlainn, 12th-century Irish king
Pádraig Mac Lochlainn, 21st-century Irish politician
Tadhg Mac Lochlainn, 20th-century Irish historian

MacLochlainn
Gerry MacLochlainn, 21st-century Irish politician
Úna MacLochlainn, 21st-century Irish singer-songwriter

See also
Meic Lochlainn, Irish family who bore the surname

References 

Irish-language masculine surnames
Patronymic surnames